Turid Kristensen  (born 8 October 1966) is a Norwegian politician. 
She was elected representative to the Storting from the constituency of Akershus for the period 2017–2021 for the Conservative Party, and re-elected in 2021.

References

1966 births
Living people
Conservative Party (Norway) politicians
Members of the Storting
Akershus politicians